Bank House is a historic home located at Milford, Kent County, Delaware, United States.  It was built between 1854 and 1857, and is a three-story, five-bay, brick Greek Revival-style dwelling. It measures 42 feet by 34 feet and has a two-story, "L"-shaped wing measuring 40 feet by 18 feet. It has a flat roof and features an entrance portico supported by classic Corinthian order fluted columns.  It was designed to be the banking house for the Bank of Milford, and included bank operations and housing for the cashier of the bank and his family.  The bank failed before the building was complete, then completed by a physician who completed it as his residence and medical office.

It was listed on the National Register of Historic Places in 1978.

References

Houses on the National Register of Historic Places in Delaware
Greek Revival houses in Delaware
Houses completed in 1857
Houses in Milford, Delaware
Houses in Kent County, Delaware
National Register of Historic Places in Kent County, Delaware
1857 establishments in Delaware